Wuxiangshan station is a station on and the southern terminus of the suburban Line S7 of the Nanjing Metro. It commenced operations along with the rest of the line on 26 May 2018. Rides from here to  along Line S7 and the connecting Line S1 typically take around 75 minutes.

References

External links

Railway stations in China opened in 2018
Nanjing Metro stations